José Núñez Jiménez (born January 13, 1964) is a former Major League Baseball pitcher. Núñez is currently a pitching coach in the Milwaukee Brewers minor league system.

After leaving the major leagues, Núñez enjoyed a long and prosperous career in Asia, playing for the Uni-President Lions (–), Fukuoka Daiei Hawks (–), Taichung Agan and Hanwha Eagles. He shares the Taiwanese professional baseball record of winning the most games in a single season (22 wins in 1993), along with Chen Yi-Hsin.

References

External links

1964 births
Águilas Cibaeñas players
Calgary Cannons players
Chicago Cubs players
Dominican Republic expatriate baseball players in Canada
Dominican Republic expatriate baseball players in Japan
Dominican Republic expatriate baseball players in South Korea
Dominican Republic expatriate baseball players in Taiwan
Dominican Republic expatriate baseball players in the United States
Fukuoka Daiei Hawks players
Hanwha Eagles players
Iowa Cubs players

Living people
Major League Baseball pitchers
Major League Baseball players from the Dominican Republic
Nippon Professional Baseball pitchers
Syracuse Chiefs players
Taichung Agan players
Toronto Blue Jays players
Uni-President Lions players
Québec Capitales players
Charleston Royals players
Fort Myers Royals players
Rieleros de Aguascalientes players
Dominican Republic expatriate baseball players in Mexico